Back Street Soccer is a Korean street soccer arcade game released by SunA Electronics in 1996. In spite of the different sport, it is similar in style and concept to Street Slam by Data East.

Gameplay
The player can select one from fourteen available national teams, with a game session spanning eight rounds of play.

The following teams are selectable:

External links 
 Back Street Soccer at Arcade History
 Back Street Soccer at GameFAQs
 

1996 video games
Arcade video games
Arcade-only video games
Association football video games
North America-exclusive video games
Video games developed in South Korea